Kivdo-Tyukan is a rural locality (a selo) in Rabochy posyolok Bureya of Bureysky District, Amur Oblast, Russia. The population was 31 as of 2018. There are 5 streets.

Geography 
Kivdo-Tyukan is located 17 km northwest of Novobureysky (the district's administrative centre) by road. Kivdinsky is the nearest rural locality.

References 

Rural localities in Bureysky District